Digital component video is defined by the ITU-R BT.601 (formerly CCIR 601) standard and uses the Y'CbCr colorspace. The specific encoding of ITU-R BT.656 was used to transmit uncompressed analog standard-definition television component signals in a multiplexed digital format.

Like analog component video, it gets its name from the fact that the video signal has been split into two or more components, that are then carried on multiple conductors between devices.

It was the internal signalling (as opposed to, e.g. RGB) in MiniDV, DV, and Digital Betacam

Component video can carry signals such as 480i, 480p, 576i, 576p, 720p, 1080i and 1080p, although many TVs do not support 1080p through component video.

See also 
 Serial digital interface
 SMPTE 344M
 Enhanced-definition television

References

External links
 PC Magazine Encyclopedia: component video

Digital display connectors
Film and video technology
Television technology
Computer display standards
High-definition television